Jordan Harris (born July 7, 2000) is an American professional ice hockey defenseman for the Montreal Canadiens of the National Hockey League (NHL). The Canadiens selected him in the third round, 71st overall, of the 2018 NHL Entry Draft.

Early life 
Harris was born on July 7, 2000, in Haverhill, Massachusetts, to Ginny and Peter Harris, a nurse and physical therapist. His father played ice hockey for UMass Lowell, and Jordan almost became a goaltender like his father and older brother Elijah, but he "liked being able to skate and play out of the net too much", so he became a defenseman. He attended Haverhill High School for one year before transferring to Kimball Union Academy, a boarding school in New Hampshire. In his three years at Kimball, Harris had 18 goals and 64 assists in 111 games, and he was the team's captain during the 2017–18 season. That season, he had six goals and 29 assists in 37 games and was also a star on Kimball's lacrosse team. Harris also played five games with the Youngstown Phantoms of the United States Hockey League during their 2017–18 season.

Playing career

College 
The Montreal Canadiens of the National Hockey League (NHL) selected Harris in the third round, 71st overall, of the 2018 NHL Entry Draft. At the time of the draft, he had committed to playing college ice hockey at Northeastern. He was joined at Northeastern by another prospect in the Canadiens organization, goaltender Cayden Primeau. Harris picked up his first collegiate goal on October 13, 2018, opening the scoring for Northeastern in their 5–0 shutout win over Sacred Heart. Harris had one goal and 12 assists in 39 games during his freshman season with Northeastern, which won both the 2019 Beanpot and the 2019 Hockey East Men's Ice Hockey Tournament.

Harris collected a point at least once in the first four games of Northeastern's 2019–20 season, doubling his goals total from the previous season. By the Huskies' holiday break, he had established himself as a playmaker for the team, with three goals and 13 points through 18 games, fifth among Hockey East defensemen. Harris won the 2020 Beanpot for Northeastern in double overtime, breaking their 4–4 tie against Boston University to give the Huskies their third title in a row. Harris's sophomore season came to a premature end due to the impacts of the COVID-19 pandemic, but the Huskies presented him with the Unsung Hero Award for his accomplishments. He finished the season with three goals and 21 points while averaging between 25 and 30 minutes of time on ice per night.

The Huskies named Harris an alternate captain for the team's 2020–21 season. His performance in the first half of the season won praise from sportswriters who were impressed by his hockey IQ, and he was named the Hockey East Player of the Week on December 14 after scoring two goals and three assists in Northeastern's opening-weekend sweep of Merrimack. With six goals and 19 points for the season, third in the conference, Harris was a semifinalist for the Walter Brown Award, a Hobey Baker Award finalist, and he was named to the Hockey East Second All-Star Team. Harris declined to sign with the Canadiens after his junior year, fueling speculation that he would attempt to become an unrestricted free agent after graduating, but he told reporters that he was more invested in finishing his degree.

The Huskies named Harris their captain for the 2021–22 season. He was named the Hockey East Defender of the Week on November 1 after scoring one goal and recording three assists in a two-game sweep of Maine. In his senior season, Harris scored five goals and 20 points in 38 games. This included five goals and 14 points in 20 conference games, for which Harris was named both a Hockey East First Team All-Star and the conference's Best Defensive Defenseman. He finished his collegiate career with 15 goals and 73 points in 130 games across four seasons.

Professional 
Shortly after the end of his college hockey career, Harris signed a two-year, entry-level contract with the Canadiens and joined them for the end of their  season. He debuted with the team on April 2, 2022, finishing the game with a plus–minus rating of +1 with three blocked shots in Montreal's 5–4 shootout win over the Tampa Bay Lightning. Playing ten games with the Canadiens to close out the season, he scored his first NHL goal in the April 29 season-ending game against the Florida Panthers. The Canadiens won the game 10–2.

International play 
Harris represented the United States internationally at the 2020 World Junior Ice Hockey Championships in the Czech Republic. He scored his first goal of the tournament on the second day, taking a pass from Trevor Zegras to tie Team USA 1–1 against Germany; the US took the game in a 6–3 victory. The US team was eliminated during the semifinals with a 1–0 loss to Finland, the first time they failed to advance to the medal round since 2015. In five games, Harris scored one goal and finished with a +4 plus-minus.

Personal life 
Harris's brother Elijah is also a hockey player. After goaltending at Austin Preparatory School, he enrolled at Endicott College to play for the Gulls. Harris and his family are Black, and they have spoken about the challenges experienced by Black hockey players.

Career statistics

Regular season and playoffs

International

Awards and honours

See also 
 List of black NHL players

References

External links 
 
 Northeastern University profile

Living people
2000 births
African-American ice hockey players
American men's ice hockey defensemen
Northeastern Huskies men's ice hockey players
Ice hockey players from Massachusetts
Sportspeople from Haverhill, Massachusetts
Montreal Canadiens draft picks
Montreal Canadiens players
Youngstown Phantoms players
AHCA Division I men's ice hockey All-Americans